Leptagonum is a genus of ground beetles in the family Carabidae. There are about 10 described species in Leptagonum, found in Africa.

Species
These 10 species belong to the genus Leptagonum:
 Leptagonum allardi Basilewsky, 1959  (the Democratic Republic of the Congo)
 Leptagonum alternatum Burgeon, 1933  (the Democratic Republic of the Congo)
 Leptagonum elegans (Péringuey, 1904)  (Zimbabwe)
 Leptagonum insignicorne (LaFerté-Sénectère, 1853)  (worldwide)
 Leptagonum interstitiale Kolbe, 1897  (the Democratic Republic of the Congo and Tanzania)
 Leptagonum overlaeti Burgeon, 1933  (the Democratic Republic of the Congo)
 Leptagonum puncticeps Basilewsky, 1953  (the Democratic Republic of the Congo)
 Leptagonum schoutedeni Burgeon, 1933  (the Democratic Republic of the Congo)
 Leptagonum sparsepunctatum Basilewsky, 1953  (the Democratic Republic of the Congo)
 Leptagonum wittei Burgeon, 1933  (the Democratic Republic of the Congo)

References

Platyninae